Sri Anantha Padmanabha Swamy Temple is a Hindu temple located in Ananthagiri, Vikarabad district in Telangana, India. It is temple of Lord Vishnu.

History
According to Skanda Purana it is believed the temple is installed by the Rishi Markandeya in Dvapara Yuga. Attracted by peaceful atmosphere of Ananthagiri hills Markandeya Rishi came here for yoga sadhana. Every day Markandeya used to go to Kasi from Ananthagiri to take a holy bath in the Ganges through a cave due to his yoga sadhana. On one day he was not able to go to Kasi as Dwadasi enter the early hours of the morning. Lord gave Darshana in dream and arranged the Ganges to flow to perform a holy bath for Rishi.

Rajarshi Muchukunda after fighting for years with rakshasas and killing mleccha Kalayavana came to Ananthagiri to take rest and went into deep sleep, He got a boon from devandra that who ever spoils the sleep of his can be killed by burning to ashes. [The hills and the cave where Muchukunda rested is also located to Mount Girnar in the state of Gujarat

Kalayavana rakshsa took control of Dwaraka and followed Lord Krishna and Balarama to Ananthagiri and spoil the sleep of Muchikunda and was killed. Lord Krishna gave darshana in the form of Sri Anantha Padmanabha Swamy to Muchikunda and blessed him to take a permanent place in the world in the form of river. Musi River that originates in these hills, a tributary of Krishna River in the Deccan Plateau region of Telangana that passes through city of Hyderabad is also referred to as Muchukunda River.

Sri Anantha Padmanaba Swamy also gave darshana to markandeya and converted into a charka to swamy.

About 400 years ago Nizam Nawabs used to come here for hunting and to take rest in the peaceful place of Ananthagiri hills, one day lord Sri Anantha Padmanabha Swamy came to Nizam dreams and asked him to build the temple for him. The main temple of the lord is constructed by Hyderabad Nawab Mir Osman Ali Khan

See also
 Ananthagiri Hills

External links
 Divine in Vikarabad
 How to reach Vikarabad district

References

Hindu temples in Vikarabad district
Vikarabad district